Damhal Hanji Pora also called as D.H.Pora  is a town and a notified area committee in Kulgam district of the Indian union territory of Jammu and Kashmir. It is one of the seven administrative blocks of the Kulgam district.

Geography
The area is bounded  by Bufliaz tehsil towards west, Thana Mandi tehsil towards west, Darhal tehsil towards south and Shopian tehsil towards east.

Road connectivity

 Damhal-Hanjipora Nehama Kulgam Road.
 Damhal-Hanjipora Ardigen kulgam Road
 Damhal-Hanjipora Laisoo kulgam Road
 Damhal-Hanjipora Laisoo Pahloo Qazigund Road
 Damhal-Hanjipora  KB PORA ROAD 
 KB PORA AHRABAL ROAD
 DH Pora Chimmer Noorabad

Health facilities
Sub District Hospital  Damhal  Hanjipora

Education
Govt Degree College D. H. Pora
Govt Higher Secondary K. B. Pora
Govt Higher secondary school D H Pora
Infotech Educational Institute D.H.Pora
Haji Aalim-ud-Din Public High School D H Pora
MSM Iqbal Educano school
Govt Higher Secondary School Manzgam 
Govt Higher Secondary School D.K.Marg
Govt Girls High School D.H.Pora
Govt Higher Secondary School Qasba Khull

Tourism 
 Aharbal waterfall and Koungwattan
 Zagimarg postures 
 Kousarnag lake
 Brahamsar Nag
 Panchanpathri 
 Kotas (Hill of Kounsarbal)  
 Hoen Heng Peak 
 Asthan Marg 
 Chersar nag
 Seh Kout (Hills of Ringath khull and Chimmer DK MARG)
 Chiranbal D.H.PORA KULGAM

See also
 Aharbal

References

Cities and towns in Kulgam district
Kulgam district